The TRML (or "Telefunken mobile airspace surveilance radar") is a family of air defense radars first developed by Telefunken and currently produced by Hensoldt. It is a development of the earlier TRMS ( or "Telefunken mobile search radar").

Retractable mast versions are TRML-2D with a rotating parabolic antenna and TRML-3D with a rotating phased array antenna, designated as Nahbereichsradar (NBR) or "short range radar" by the Bundeswehr. The latest TRML-4D comes with non-retractable,  rotating base active electronically scanned array (AESA) solid-state antenna.

System description 

TRML-2D was designed as an autonomous mobile command system for air defense with an integrated search radar. It can detect, identifiy and track aircraft at low and medium altitude, designate targets for the connected launchers and send commands to the battle management network. 
The range of the radar is 60 km for TRML-2D, 200 km for the TRML-3D/32, and 250 km for TRML-4D.

The crew shelter with integrated retractable mast is loaded onto a truck (Bundeswehr designation "Lkw 15 t mil gl BR"), but can also be dismantled to operate as a standalone trailer. A power generator is integrated on the unit. The crew consists of two or three surveillance radar operators.

The radar includes a sideband channel for detecting helicopters. This enables simultaneous action against fast, low-flying aircraft and anti-aircraft missiles as well as against extremely slow-flying targets such as hovering elicopters. The EPM (Electronic Protective Measures) equipment to protect against ECM in the Electronic Warfare and high-resolution Clutter suppression permit the detection and monitoring of even very small targets in difficult environmental conditions. TRML can feed the detected tracks into air defense combat management systems (HFLaAFüSyS 9, HEROS 2) to create more detailed picture of the airspace.

The manufacturer is the company DASA, which has been merged into EADS and has been trading under the name Airbus Defense and Space since January 2014. With the spin-off of the electronics division of Airbus Defense and Space at the end of February 2017, the company became Hensoldt.

TRML 2D 

TRML-2D uses rotating parabolic antenna with a cosecant-square pattern, where the lower edge slightly deviating from the parabolic shape (a so-called "lower lip"). The antenna can transmit and receive linearly and circularly polarized signals. The maximum antenna height is 12 m (top edge); the antenna can also operate on the roof of the shelter. Rotation rate is 14 to 27 RPM (2.25 to 4.44 s). The IFF antenna is integrated into the primary antenna. An omnidirectional antenna element for sidelobe suppression is located above the parabolic reflector. Ro

The range is specified by the manufacturer as 46 km for targets with a radar cross-section of 1 m² and a probability of detection of 80% up to an altitude of 6000 m. For targets with a radar cross section of 3 m², the range is 60 km.

TRML 3D 
 
TRML-3D version is fitted with a 16 or 32-element passive electronically scanned array. In the standard version, the antenna has linear horizontal polarization; vertical polarization is available as an option.

The marine search radar TRS-3D was created from blocks used by the TRML-3D.

TRML-4D 
 
The latest variant of the radar was presented by Hensoldt at the Eurosatory in 2018. It will be delivered to customers in 2020.

The radar unit includes a completely redesigned AESA antenna with solid-state GaN elements, mounted on a non-retractable continuously rotating base. The system does not include an integrated operator shelter anymore, so a separate module is needed. TRML-4D combines digital beamforming with pulse-Doppler radar to detect difficult-to-locate airborne targets such as hovering helicopters or low-flying cruise missiles. The system has increased performance compared to its predecessors and is able to track 1500 targets at a range of up to 250 km. It supports Mode 5 and Mode S identification. The radar unit includes an onboard power generator and can be carried by any truck that has standard 20 ft (6.1 m) ISO container fittings. Instrumented range is 250 km, can track fighter type targets more than 120 km away.

Operators

Notes 

Ground radars